The Tri-Service aircraft designation system is a unified system introduced in 1962 by the United States Department of Defense for designating all U.S. military aircraft. Previously, the U.S. armed services used separate nomenclature systems.

Under the tri-service designation system, officially introduced on 18 September 1962, almost all aircraft receive a unified designation, whether they are operated by the United States Air Force (USAF), United States Navy (USN), United States Marine Corps (USMC), United States Army, or United States Coast Guard (USCG). Experimental aircraft operated by manufacturers or by NASA are also often assigned designations from the X-series of the tri-service system.

The 1962 system was based on the one used by the USAF between 1948 and 1962, which was in turn based on the type, model, series USAAS/USAAC/USAAF system used from 1924 to 1948.  The 1962 system has been modified and updated since introduction.

History
The Tri-Service system was first enacted on 6 July 1962 by the DoD Directive 4505.6 "Designating, Redesignating, and Naming Military Aircraft" and was implemented via Air Force Regulation (AFR) 66-11, Army Regulation (AR) 700-26, Bureau of Weapons Instruction (BUWEPSINST) 13100.7 on 18 September 1962. Anecdotally, the Tri-Service system was partly brought about due to Secretary of Defense Robert McNamara's confusion and frustration with the different designation systems the Navy and Air Force used at the time which resulted in the F-4H and F-110 both being used to refer to, essentially, the same aircraft. The Tri-Service aircraft designation system was presented alongside the 1963 rocket and guided missile designation system in Air Force Regulation (AFR) 82-1/Army Regulation (AR) 70-50/Naval Material Command Instruction (NAVMATINST) 8800.4A (published 27 March 1974) and the two systems have been concurrently presented and maintained in joint publications since.

The most recent changes were mandated by Joint Regulation 4120.15E Designating and Naming Military Aerospace Vehicles and were implemented via Air Force Instruction (AFI) 16-401, Army Regulation (AR) 70-50, Naval Air Systems Command Instruction (NAVAIRINST) 13100.16 on 3 November 2020. The list of military aircraft was maintained via 4120.15-L Model Designation of Military Aerospace Vehicles until its transition to data.af.mil on 31 August 2018.

Designation system
The system uses a Mission-Design-Series (MDS) designation of the form:
(Status Prefix)(Modified Mission)(Basic Mission)(Vehicle Type)-(Design Number)(Series Letter)
Of these components, only the Basic Mission, Design Number and Series Letter are mandatory. In the case of special vehicles a Vehicle Type symbol must also be included.  The U.S. Air Force characterizes this designation system as "MDS", while the Navy, and Marine Corps refer to it as Type/Model/Series (T/M/S).

Status prefix
These optional prefixes are attached to aircraft not conducting normal operations, such as research, testing and development. The prefixes are:
 e: Digitally developed
 G: Permanently grounded
 J: Special test, temporary
 N: Special test, permanent
 X: Experimental
 Y: Prototype
 Z: Planning

A temporary special test means the aircraft is intended to return to normal service after the tests are completed, while permanent special test aircraft are not. The Planning code is no longer used but was meant to designate aircraft "on the drawing board". For example, using this system an airframe such as the F-13 could have initially been designated as ZF-13 during the design phase, possibly XF-13 if experimental testing was required before building a prototype, the YF-13; the final production model would simply be designated F-13 (with the first production variant being the F-13A). Continuing the example, some F-13s during their service life may have been used for testing modifications or researching new designs and designated JF-13 or NF-13; finally after many years of service, the airframe would be permanently grounded due to safety or economic reasons as GF-13.

Modified mission
Aircraft which are modified after manufacture or even built for a different mission to the standard airframe of a particular design are assigned a modified mission code. They are:
 A: Attack 
 C: Cargo (i.e., transport)
 D: Drone director
 E: Electronic warfare
 F: Fighter
 H: Search and rescue, MEDEVAC
 K: Tanker
 L: Modified for cold weather operations
 M: Multi-mission (i.e., Special Operations)
 O: Observation
 P: Maritime patrol
 Q: Unmanned aerial vehicle
 R: Reconnaissance
 S: Anti-submarine warfare
 T: Trainer
 U: Utility
 V: VIP transport 
 W: Weather reconnaissance

The multi-mission and utility missions could be considered the same thing; however they are applied to multipurpose aircraft conducting certain categories of mission. M-aircraft conduct combat or special operations while U-aircraft conduct combat support missions, such as transport (e.g., UH-60) and electronic warfare (e.g., MC-12). Historically, the vast majority of U.S. Coast Guard air assets included the H-code (e.g., HH-60 Jayhawk or HC-130 Hercules). In the 21st century, the Coast Guard has used the multi-mission designation for their armed rescue helicopters (MH-60 Jayhawk or MH-65 Dolphin).

Basic mission
All aircraft are to be assigned a basic mission code. In some cases, the basic mission code is replaced by one of the modified mission codes when it is more suitable (e.g., M in MH-53J Pave Low III). The defined codes are:
 A: Attack aircraft (for tactical air-to-surface mission)
 B: Bomber (for strategic air-to-surface mission)
 C: Cargo (i.e. Transport)
 E: Special electronic installation
 F: Fighter
 K: Tanker (dropped between 1977 and 1985)
 L: Laser-equipped
 O: Observation (Forward Air Control)
 P: Maritime patrol
 R: Reconnaissance
 S: Anti-submarine warfare
 T: Trainer
 U: Utility
 X: Special research

The rise of the multirole fighter in the decades since the system was introduced has created some confusion about the difference between attack and fighter aircraft. According to the current designation system, an attack aircraft (A) is designed primarily for air-to-surface missions (also known as "attack missions"), while a fighter category F incorporates not only aircraft designed primarily for air-to-air warfare, but also multipurpose aircraft designed also for attack missions. The Air Force has even assigned the F designation to attack-only aircraft, such as the F-111 Aardvark and F-117 Nighthawk.

The only A designated aircraft currently in the U.S. Air Force is the A-10 Thunderbolt II. The last front line A designated in the U.S. Navy and Marine Corps was the A-6 Intruder, with the only strictly A designated fixed-wing aircraft remaining is the A-29 Super Tucano leased under the Imminent Fury program.

When the new mission codes were implemented, the numerical series were restarted, causing some redesignated naval aircraft and subsequent new designs to overlap disused USAAC/USAAF designations.

Of these code series, no normal aircraft have been assigned a K or R basic mission code in a manner conforming to the system.

Vehicle type
The vehicle type element is used to designate the type of aerospace craft. Aircraft not in one of the following categories (most fixed-wing aircraft) are not required to carry a type designator. The type categories are:
 D: Unmanned aerial vehicle (UAV) control segment
 G: Glider
 H: Helicopter
 Q: Unmanned aerial vehicle
 S: Spaceplane
 V: Vertical take-off/short take-off and landing (VTOL/STOL)
 Z: Lighter-than-air

A UAV control segment is not an aircraft, it is the ground control equipment used to command a UAV.  Only in recent years has an aircraft been designated as a spaceplane, the proposed MS-1A.

Design number
According to the designation system, aircraft of a particular vehicle type or basic mission (for manned, fixed-wing, powered aircraft) were to be numbered consecutively. Numbers were not to be assigned to avoid confusion with other letter sequences or to conform with manufacturers' model numbers. Recently this rule has been ignored, and aircraft have received a design number equal to the model number (e.g., KC-767A) or have kept the design number when they are transferred from one series to another (e.g., the X-35 became the F-35).

Series letter
Different versions of the same basic aircraft type are to be delineated using a single letter suffix beginning with "A" and increasing sequentially (skipping "I" and "O" to avoid confusion with the numbers "1" and "0"). It is not clear how much modification is required to merit a new series letter, e.g., the F-16C production run has varied extensively over time. The modification of an aircraft to carry out a new mission does not necessarily require a new suffix (e.g., F-111Cs modified for reconnaissance are designated RF-111C), but often a new letter is assigned (e.g., the UH-60As modified for Search and Rescue missions are designated HH-60G).

Some series letters have been skipped to forestall confusion with pre-1962 naval designations; for instance, there was no "H" version of the F-4 Phantom II because the aircraft type was previously designated F4H.

Non-systematic aircraft designations
Since the 1962 system was introduced there have been several instances of non-systematic aircraft designations and skipping of design numbers.

Non-systematic or aberrant designations
The most common changes are to use a number from another series, or some other choice, rather than the next available number (117, 767, 71). Another is to change the order of the letters or use new acronym based letters (e.g. SR) rather than existing ones.  Non-systematic designations are both official and correct, since the DOD has final authority to approve such designations.

 RC-7B
Designation conflicted with unrelated C-7 Caribou (later redesignated EO-5C in August 2004).

 F/A-18 Hornet, also the transient F/A-16 and F/A-22.
Originally, the Navy planned to have two variants of the Hornet: the F-18 fighter and A-18 light attack aircraft. During development, "F/A-18" was used as a shorthand to refer to both variants. When the Navy decided to develop a single aircraft able to perform both missions, the "F/A" appellation stuck despite the designation system not allowing for slashes or other characters.  AF-18 would be conformant. Similar issues existed with the naming of the F-22, though the naming of an attack variant was mooted by designation of the FB-22 (which, more appropriately, should have been designated BF-22).

 F-35 Lightning II
The F designation is expected, but the series number 35 comes from its X-35 designation, rather than the next available F- series number (24).

 FB-111 Aardvark
Should have been designated BF-111 as a fighter modified for bombing capabilities. Also should have used the next available number in the bomber sequence but 111 was retained for commonality with the F-111 from the pre-1962 system.

 F-117 Nighthawk
Designated as part of series continuing from the pre-1962 system and latterly used to identify foreign aircraft acquired by the government, e.g., YF-113 was a MiG-23. Additionally, the basic mission designation as fighter implies air-to-air capabilities though the F-117 does not possess any. There have been conjecture and anecdotal reports concerning purported air-to-air capabilities targeted toward destroying Soviet AWACS craft.

 SR-71
The SR-71 designator is a continuation of the pre-1962 bomber series, which ended with the XB-70 Valkyrie. During the later period of its testing, the B-70 was proposed for the Reconnaissance/Strike role, with an RS-70 designation.  The USAF decided instead to pursue the Lockheed A-12 which was dubbed RS-71 (Reconnaissance/Surveillance; unrelated to the S mission designation for anti-submarine warfare). Then-USAF Chief of Staff Curtis LeMay preferred the SR (Strategic Reconnaissance) moniker and wanted the reconnaissance aircraft to be named SR-71. Before the Blackbird was to be announced by President Johnson on 29 February 1964, LeMay lobbied to modify Johnson's speech to read SR-71 instead of RS-71. The media transcript given to the press at the time still had the earlier RS-71 designation in places, creating the myth that the president had misread the aircraft's designation.

 TR-1
A variant of the U-2; uses its own modified mission letter (T for Tactical) with basic mission letter (R for Reconnaissance). The U-2 was initially designated as "utility" to obfuscate its reconnaissance capabilities. Following shootdowns of the aircraft, this subterfuge was pointless. The TR-1, first flown in 1981, was later re-designated U-2R in 1991 after the end of the Cold War for uniformity.

 KC-45
Proposed tanker based on the Airbus A330 for the KC-X program. This designation skipped 42–44.

 KC-767
Skipped hundreds of C- series numbers to use Boeing's model number.  Has conformant basic mission and modified mission letters. Only used for aircraft sold to foreign air forces.  The U.S. Air Force ordered the Boeing 767-based tanker KC-46.

Skipped design numbers
The design number "13" has been skipped in many mission and vehicle series for its association with superstition. Some numbers were skipped when a number was requested and/or assigned to a project but the aircraft was never built.

The following table lists design numbers in the 1962 system which have been skipped.

 *: Skipped to avoid confusion with the North American T-2 Buckeye, which was still in service at the time.
 **: The T-4 and T-5 designations were skipped in favor of T-6 by Raytheon to honor the WW2-era North American T-6 Texan. The designations are considered skipped as the sequence continued with the T-7 rather than continuing from the last otherwise sequential designation.
 #: A-8 was technically skipped, but the AV-8 Harrier received the number within the "V" vehicle type sequence. Within the V sequence, it should have been designated AV-12 (as the Ryan XV-8 "Fleep" was already in existence).
†: The C-42 through C-44 designations were skipped in favor of the C-45 by Airbus.  The designations are considered skipped as the sequence continued in with the C-46 rather than continuing from the last otherwise sequential designation.

Manufacturer's code
From 1939, a 2-letter manufacturer's code was added to designations to easily identify the manufacturer and the production plant. For example, F-15E-50-MC, the "MC" being the code for the McDonnell Douglas plant at St. Louis, Missouri.

Block number
In 1941 block numbers were added to designations to show minor equipment variations between production blocks. The block number appears in the designation between the model suffix and manufacturers code (for example F-100D-85-NH). Initially they incremented in numerical order −1, −2, −3 but this was changed to −1, −5, −10, −15 in increments of five. The gaps in the block numbers could be used for post-delivery modifications, for example a F-100D-85-NH could be modified in the field to F-100D-86-NH. Not all types have used block numbers.

See also
 British military aircraft designation systems
 Hull classification symbol
 Italian Armed Forces aircraft designation system
 Japanese military aircraft designation systems
 List of military aircraft of the United States
 List of United States Navy aircraft designations (pre-1962)
 RLM aircraft designation system
 Soviet Union military aircraft designation systems
 United States military aircraft designation systems

Explanatory notes

References

Citations

General and cited references

External links
 U.S. Military Aviation on Designation-Systems.net by Andreas Parsch—a reference source with details, examples and history
  Non-standard designations page on Designation-Systems.net
 Designation Systems FAQ on hazegray.org by Emmanuel Gustin
 U.S. Military Aircraft Designations 1911–2004 on driko.org by Andrew Chorney
 U.S. Military Aircraft and Weapon Designations by Derek O. Bridges

1962 in the United States
United States
United States Department of Defense
United States military aircraft